Katherine Marlowe may refer to:

Katherine Marlowe, fictional character of the Uncharted franchise
Katherine Marlowe (actress) (1914–2010), American film actress